Miroslav Radović (born 16 January 1984) is a Serbian former footballer who played as a winger.

Radović started his career with Partizan, before joining Polish club Legia Warsaw in the summer of 2006. He acquired Polish citizenship in January 2014.

Club career

Partizan
After signing his first professional contract with Partizan in June 2003, Radović was promoted to the senior squad under manager Lothar Matthäus during the 2003–04 campaign. He also made his UEFA Champions League debut that season, coming on as a substitute for Milivoje Ćirković in a 1–2 away loss against Porto on 26 November 2003. In the following 2004–05 campaign, Radović helped Partizan win the national championship title with an unbeaten record. He also scored a memorable goal in the 88th minute that eliminated Dnipro Dnipropetrovsk in the UEFA Cup round of 32. In the 2005–06 season, Radović made 19 appearances in all competitions, scoring three goals. He eventually left the club in the 2006 summer transfer window.

Legia Warsaw
On 30 June 2006, Radović signed with Polish club Legia Warsaw on a four-year deal. He made his official debut for the side on 22 July 2006, as they lost their Super Cup match 1–2 to Wisła Płock. On 12 August 2006, Radović scored his first goal for Legia in a 1–2 home league loss to GKS Bełchatów. He made a total of 27 league appearances and scored six goals in his first season at the club. In the following season, Radović won his first trophy with Legia by beating Wisła Kraków in the 2007–08 Polish Cup final after penalties.

In January 2009, Radović signed a new contract with the club until the summer of 2012. He subsequently became one of Legia's key players, being the team's top scorer in the 2010–11 season. In June 2011, Radović extended his contract with Legia on a three-year deal. He scored both of his team's goals in a 2–2 home draw with Spartak Moscow in the first leg of the UEFA Europa League play-off round on 18 August 2011. In Group C's second round, Radović scored an 89th-minute winning goal in a 3–2 home win over Hapoel Tel Aviv. He also scored three goals in two games against Rapid București, as the club reached the competition's round of 32.

After seven years of playing in Poland, Radović won his first Ekstraklasa title in the 2012–13 season. He also led the club to the second league title in a row while scoring 14 league goals in the 2013–14 season. On 16 July 2014, Radović scored a 90th minute equalizer in a 1–1 draw with St Patrick's Athletic in the first leg of the UEFA Champions League second qualifying round. He subsequently netted a brace in a 5–0 return leg victory. On 30 July 2014, Radović was the scorer of two goals in his team's 4–1 win over Celtic. However, the club was eliminated in the third qualifying round following a 0–3 forfeit loss at Celtic Park.

Hebei China Fortune
In February 2015, Radović left Legia after almost nine years and signed a two-year contract with China League One club Hebei China Fortune. He was one of the first acquisitions of newly appointed manager Radomir Antić. However, Radović missed the majority of the 2015 season due to an injury, making only five league appearances and scoring two goals, as the club gained promotion to the Super League.

Olimpija Ljubljana
On 8 February 2016, Radović signed a one-and-a-half-year contract with Olimpija Ljubljana. He immediately became an important part of the team, helping them win the league title for the first time in the club's history. On 8 June 2016, Radović mutually terminated his contract with the club.

Return to Partizan
On 15 June 2016, after spending ten years abroad, Radović officially returned to his parent club Partizan. He signed a two-year deal and was given the number 10 shirt. On 14 July 2016, Radović made his second debut for Partizan, playing the full 90 minutes in a 0–0 home draw with Zagłębie Lubin in the first leg of the UEFA Europa League second qualifying round. He scored his first goal upon his return to the club in a 2–0 away league win over Javor Ivanjica on 10 August 2016.

Return to Legia Warsaw
On 31 August 2016, Radović left Partizan, spending less than three months in his second tenure at the club, and returned to Legia Warsaw on a two-year deal. He converted a penalty in a 1–5 away loss against Real Madrid in Champions League's Group F on 18 October 2016. Two weeks later, Radović scored against the same opponent, this time at home, in an eventual 3–3 draw.

International career
Radović made his debut for the Serbia and Montenegro national under-21 team in their successful qualifying campaign for the 2006 UEFA European Championship. He was omitted from the main 22-man squad for the final tournament held in Portugal. In September 2006, Radović played for the Serbia national under-21 team at the start of the qualifications for the 2007 UEFA European Championship, but again missed out on the final tournament.

Personal life
In June 2014, Radović married his long-time girlfriend Sandra. The couple have three sons: Nikša, Matej and Jakov.

Career statistics

Honours

Club
Partizan
 First League of Serbia and Montenegro: 2004–05
Legia Warsaw
 Ekstraklasa: 2012–13, 2013–14, 2016–17, 2017–18
 Polish Cup: 2007–08, 2010–11, 2011–12, 2012–13, 2017–18
 Polish SuperCup: 2008
Olimpija Ljubljana
 Slovenian PrvaLiga: 2015–16

Individual
 Ekstraklasa Best Player: 2014

Notes

References

External links

 
 
 
 

Association football wingers
China League One players
Ekstraklasa players
Expatriate footballers in China
Expatriate footballers in Poland
Expatriate footballers in Slovenia
First League of Serbia and Montenegro players
FK Partizan players
FK Teleoptik players
Hebei F.C. players
Legia Warsaw players
Naturalized citizens of Poland
NK Olimpija Ljubljana (2005) players
People from Goražde
Serbia and Montenegro footballers
Serbia and Montenegro under-21 international footballers
Serbia under-21 international footballers
Serbian expatriate footballers
Serbian expatriate sportspeople in China
Serbian expatriate sportspeople in Poland
Serbian expatriate sportspeople in Slovenia
Serbian footballers
Serbs of Bosnia and Herzegovina
Slovenian PrvaLiga players
1984 births
Living people